Iron Order Motorcycle Club (IOMC) is a motorcycle club that was formed on July 4, 2004, in Jeffersonville, Indiana.  With a worldwide membership of members, the Iron Order is one of the largest and fastest growing motorcycle clubs in the world.  The IOMC has chapters in nearly every U.S. state and in 11 countries around the world.

History
The Iron Order Motorcycle Club was founded by eight (8) individuals: Bad Dog, Big Rick, Chief, Copper, Doc, Ice, Izod, and Professor in Jeffersonville, Indiana on Independence Day 2004.  The following year the club expanded into Kentucky, and by 2006, several chapters had been established in five additional states.  Since then, the club has grown significantly and has approximately 283 chapters spread across the continental United States.  It has also branched out internationally with 20+ chapters in 11 other countries across the world to include: Aruba, Bonaire, Brazil, Canada, Curacao, England, France, Germany, Puerto Rico, Slovakia and South Korea.

According to their website, the Iron Order Motorcycle Club's goal is to be like the motorcycle clubs of the 1950s and 1960s who were, "non-conformists."  Furthermore, their website states the IOMC is not a criminal organization and does not condone any form of criminal activity from its members.  The IOMC states it's not an outlaw motorcycle club, nor do they claim to be 1%ers.  However, the Department of Justice and multiple California state and local law enforcement agencies recognize the IOMC as an outlaw motorcycle gang.  The membership of the IOMC is made up of individuals from diverse backgrounds to include active and retired military and law enforcement personnel.

Charitable actions and philanthropy
The Iron Order Motorcycle Club is involved with multitudes of charities, mostly at the local level within each charter's region.  The organization firmly believes in giving back to the communities in which they ride.

During February 2016 in Massachusetts, the Iron Order raised over $13,000 in Greater New Bedford to support the Veteran's transition house.  Additionally, members from the Fairfield and Cape Cod chapters paid for building permits and the materials to build a wheelchair ramp for a local community member who recently lost their leg.

On September 23, 2017, in Westerly, RI, the Iron Order gathered for the 5th annual Johnnycake Motorcycle Run and raised $3000 to support individuals and families in crisis within the local community.

Throughout the year and across the country, the IOMC supports their communities and individuals in need by participating in charity rides and fundraisers.  IOMC chapters will often post about upcoming events on their websites.

Criminal allegations and incidents
The IOMC prides themselves as being a law abiding, independent and neutral motorcycle club.  Due to the structured make-up of the IOMC, over the years past the IOMC has been confronted by several outlaw motorcycle clubs.  The IOMC usually goes out of its way to avoid criminal activity, even requiring its members to have concealed-carry weapons permits as a way to vet out convicted felons, said Steve Cook, executive director of the Midwest Outlaw Motorcycle Gang Investigators Association.  The IOMC has remained steadfast in being an independent and neutral motorcycle club, which has resulted in verbal and physical confrontations with other clubs.

On June 5, 2013, an altercation involving the Iron Order and Los Lobos MC occurred in Cheyenne, Wyoming.  The scuffle involved almost 20 people and ended with two arrests for members of the Los Lobos.

On June 26, 2014, Zachariah Tipton, a member of the Black Pistons Motorcycle Club, a support club of the Outlaws Motorcycle Club, was shot and killed by an Iron Order prospect Kristopher Stone (who is a medic in the National Guard).  The Florida State attorney did not charge the member of the Iron Order, claiming they believed his actions to be justified.
 
On June 7, 2014, a violent altercation occurred between members of the Iron Order MC and the Chosen Sons Motorcycle Club. No members of the Iron Order were charged; however, four members of The Chosen Sons MC were arrested and received charges. The attorney of one of the accused stated that he believes that "people were selectively charged". During this period the group also managed to build up a significant rivalry with the Hells Angels due to their history with law enforcement.

On February 21, 2015, a shootout occurred in Meridian, Mississippi between members of the Iron Order Motorcycle Club and members of the Pistoleros MC.  Three people were injured.

On June 10, 2015, the Iron Order MC was involved in fight with the Iron Horsemen MC in Kentucky.  One person was hit by a vehicle.  Later that year, three more people would be shot when altercations occurred between the Iron Order and the Bandidos Motorcycle Club.

On June 19, 2015 around 9:45pm, a fight broke out outside a restaurant in Lower Heidelberg Township, Pennsylvania between Iron Order members Wayne Ritchie and Timothy Martin and Mark Groff.  Groff’s fiancee, Tonya Focht, got involved during which time she fell in front of a moving vehicle and is believed to have been run over by the back right wheel.  The Berks District Attorney, John T Adams, stated that their investigation did not uncover enough information to file homicide charges.
 
On January 30, 2016, an altercation that would come to be known as the National Western Complex shootout occurred in Denver, Colorado at the National Western Complex. Members of the Mongols Motorcycle Club and members of the Iron Order Motorcycle Club clashed; this resulted in multiple injuries. Two members of the Mongols were shot, one of whom died. the Iron Order claimed that the act was in self-defense, which the group had been acquitted on many times in the past. The Florida State attorney general did not press charges on the club. This forced The Mongols to take a very different approach for their club, by holding a press conference to publicly announce that the club did not agree this shooting was in self-defense and that it was in fact an act of murder. Full-Patch member of the Iron Order MC, Derrick "Kong" Duran, was arrested after the murder and can be witnessed in video surveillance at the complex holding a firearm. As well as being a member of the motorcycle club, Derrick Duran was an employee of the Colorado Department of Corrections. Denver District Attorney Mitchell R. Morrissey dropped the charges against Derrick Duran.

Mongols attorney Stephen Stubbs had this statement to make:
 
"Pulling a gun after one of your buddies pushes someone is not reasonable and cannot be self-defense … shooting an unarmed person that tries to disarm you, after you unlawfully brandish a gun, cannot be self-defense. Running to the top of the stairs, pointing a gun at the crowd below, and shooting an unarmed man that bravely tries to disarm you cannot be self-defense."

References

Outlaw motorcycle clubs
Motorcycle clubs in the United States